Mircea Georgescu (born 8 July 1938) is a Romanian former footballer who played as a defender.

International career
Mircea Georgescu played three games at international level for Romania, including a 6–0 loss against Spain at the 1964 European Nations' Cup qualifiers.

Honours
Steaua București
Cupa României: 1965–66, runner-up 1963–64

References

External links
Mircea Georgescu at Labtof.ro

1938 births
Romanian footballers
Romania international footballers
Association football defenders
Liga I players
Liga II players
FC Politehnica Timișoara players
FCV Farul Constanța players
FC Steaua București players
Living people